The Virgo Cluster is a large cluster of galaxies whose center is 53.8 ± 0.3 Mly (16.5 ± 0.1 Mpc) away in the constellation Virgo. Comprising approximately 1,300 (and possibly up to 2,000) member galaxies, the cluster forms the heart of the larger Virgo Supercluster, of which the Local Group (containing our Milky Way galaxy) is a member. The Local Group actually experiences the mass of the Virgo Supercluster as the Virgocentric flow. It is estimated that the Virgo Cluster's mass is 1.2  out to 8 degrees of the cluster's center or a radius of about 2.2 Mpc.

Many of the brighter galaxies in this cluster, including the giant elliptical galaxy Messier 87, were discovered in the late 1770s and early 1780s and subsequently included in Charles Messier's catalogue of non-cometary fuzzy objects. Described by Messier as nebulae without stars, their true nature was not recognized until the 1920s.

The cluster subtends a maximum arc of approximately 8 degrees centered in the constellation Virgo. Although some of the cluster's most prominent members can be seen with smaller instruments, a 6-inch telescope will reveal about 160 of the cluster's galaxies on a clear night. Its brightest member is the elliptical galaxy Messier 49; however its most famous member is the elliptical galaxy Messier 87, which is located in the center of the cluster.

Characteristics 
The cluster is a fairly heterogeneous mixture of spiral and elliptical galaxies. , it is believed that the spiral galaxies of the cluster are distributed in an oblong prolate filament, approximately four times as long as it is wide, stretching along the line of sight from the Milky Way. The elliptical galaxies are more centrally concentrated than the spiral galaxies.

The cluster is an aggregate of at least three separate subclumps: Virgo A, centered on M87, a second centered on the galaxy M86, and Virgo B, centered on M49, with some authors including a Virgo C subcluster, centered on the galaxy M60 as well as a LVC (Low Velocity Cloud) subclump, centered on the large spiral galaxy NGC 4216. Notably, the giant elliptical galaxy M87 contains a supermassive black hole, whose event horizon was observed by the Event Horizon Telescope Collaboration in 2019.

Of all of the subclumps, Virgo A, formed by a mixture of elliptical, lenticular, and (usually) gas-poor spiral galaxies, is the dominant one, with a mass of approximately 1014 , which is approximately an order of magnitude larger than the other two subclumps.

The three subgroups are in the process of merging to form a larger single cluster and are surrounded by other smaller galaxy clouds, mostly composed of spiral galaxies, known as N Cloud, S Cloud, and Virgo E that are in the process of infalling to merge with them, plus other farther isolated galaxies and galaxy groups (like the galaxy cloud Coma I) that are also attracted by the gravity of Virgo to merge with it in the future. This strongly suggests the Virgo cluster is a dynamically young cluster that is still forming.

Other two nearby aggregations known as M Cloud, W Cloud, and W' Cloud seem to be background systems independent of the main cluster.

The large mass of the cluster is indicated by the high peculiar velocities of many of its galaxies, sometimes as high as 1,600 km/s with respect to the cluster's center.

The Virgo cluster lies within the Virgo Supercluster, and its gravitational effect slows down the nearby galaxies. The large mass of the cluster has the effect of slowing down the recession of the Local Group from the cluster by approximately ten percent.

Molecular gasses in Virgo Cluster has been swept away by a huge cosmic broom that is preventing nearby galaxies from birthing new stars. The actual cause of it has been a long standing mystery in astrophysics. According to scientists, it occurs because of the extreme environment of the Virgo Cluster.

Intracluster medium 
As with many other rich galaxy clusters, Virgo's intracluster medium is filled with a hot, rarefied plasma at temperatures of 30 million kelvins that emits X-Rays. Within the intracluster medium (ICM) are found a large number of intergalactic stars (up to 10% of the stars in the cluster), including some planetary nebulae.  It is theorized that these were expelled from their home galaxies by interactions with other galaxies.  The ICM also contains some globular clusters, possibly stripped off dwarf galaxies, and even at least one star formation region.

Galaxies 

Below is a table of bright or notable objects in the cluster and their subunit (subcluster). Note that in some cases a galaxy may be considered in a different subunit by other researchers (sources:)

Column 1: The name of the galaxy.
Column 2: The right ascension for epoch 2000.
Column 3: The declination for epoch 2000.
Column 4: The blue apparent magnitude of the galaxy.
Column 5: The galaxy type: E=Elliptical, S0=Lenticular, Sa,Sb,Sc,Sd=Spiral, SBa,SBb,SBc,SBd=Barred spiral, Sm,SBm,Irr=Irregular.
Column 6: The angular diameter of the galaxy (arcminutes).
Column 7: The diameter of the galaxy (thousands of light years).
Column 8: The recessional velocity (km/s) of the galaxy relative to the cosmic microwave background.
Column 9: Subcluster where the galaxy is located.

Fainter galaxies within the cluster are usually known by their numbers in the Virgo Cluster Catalog, particularly members of the numerous dwarf galaxy population.

See also
 Virgo III Groups
 Coma Cluster – another large, nearby cluster of galaxies
 Eridanus Cluster
 Fornax Cluster – a smaller nearby cluster of galaxies
 Norma Cluster
 List of galaxy clusters
 Virgocentric flow

Notes

References

External links
 The Virgo Cluster at An Atlas of the Universe, map (and table) of the 160 largest galaxies
 California Institute of Technology site on Virgo cluster.
 The Virgo Cluster of Galaxies, SEDS Messier pages
 Partial Virgo cluster centered on M87 (Dark Atmospheres)
 The Virgo Cluster Catalog

 
Virgo Supercluster
Virgo (constellation)
Coma Berenices